Varfolomeyevka is a village (selo) in Yakovlevsky District of Primorsky Krai, Russia.  Population: 1,300 (2005 est.).

The village hosts the 799th Reconnaissance Aviation Regiment of the 11th Air Army of the Russian Air Force.

A railway station of the same name, incorporated as a separate inhabited locality, is located in the vicinity of the village.

References

Rural localities in Primorsky Krai